Steve Knapp (born April 17, 1964, Minneapolis, Minnesota), is a former driver in IndyCar.  He raced in the 1998–2000 seasons with 13 career starts, including 3 at the Indianapolis 500. His best career finish was in his first race, a third place at the 1998 Indianapolis 500, where he was named Rookie of the Year.  He never led a lap in any of his IRL races. Knapp now owns and operates Elite Engines out of West Bend specializing in FA, FC, S2, HART F2 and Mazda engines for the U.S. F2000 National Championship.

Racing record

SCCA National Championship Runoffs

IRL IndyCar Series

 1 The 1999 VisionAire 500K at Charlotte was cancelled after 79 laps due to spectator fatalities.

Indy 500 results

External links
Driver DB Profile
Elite Engines

1964 births
Living people
IndyCar Series drivers
Atlantic Championship drivers
Indianapolis 500 drivers
Indianapolis 500 Rookies of the Year
Racing drivers from Minneapolis
Racing drivers from Minnesota
Sportspeople from Minneapolis
SCCA National Championship Runoffs winners
U.S. F2000 National Championship drivers

PDM Racing drivers
Dreyer & Reinbold Racing drivers